The Icelandic Sheepdog, is an Icelandic breed of dog of Nordic Spitz type. It derives from dogs brought to Iceland by Viking settlers in the ninth century; it is both similar and closely related to the Buhund of Norway and the Vallhund of Sweden, which  derive from the same ancestral stock.

It is the only dog breed indigenous to Iceland. Its traditional uses include herding of both sheep and horses.

History 

The Icelandic Sheepdog is one of very few breeds of dog for which claims of ancient origin are demonstrably supported by both archaeological and written evidence. It derives from dogs brought to Iceland by Viking colonists from 874 onwards; these are thought to have been from the same ancestral stock which gave rise to the modern Buhund of Norway and Vallhund of Sweden.

As a result of commerce with Iceland in the Middle Ages, the dog became fairly well known in other European countries including England and France. An early description dates to 1492. It is mentioned by John Caius in his writings on dogs in 1570, and by William Shakespeare in Henry V, thought to date from about 1599. Sir Thomas Browne reportedly wrote in 1650: "To England there are sometimes exported from Iceland ... a type of dog resembling a fox ... Shepherds in England are eager to acquire them!"

The  or Iceland Dog was both discussed and illustrated in the fifth volume of the Histoire Naturelle of Georges-Louis Leclerc, Comte de Buffon, published in 1755.

Plague and canine distemper destroyed over 75% of the breed in the late 19th century, leading to a ban on the importation of dogs to Iceland. The purebred Icelandic Sheepdog was again bordering extinction in the late 20th century.

In 1994 the Alþingi (national parliament) determined that the Icelandic Sheepdog was part of the cultural heritage of the country, and should be protected as a national breed. In 1996 an international breed association, the Icelandic Sheepdog International Cooperation, was formed; it has ten European member kennel clubs (including that of Iceland), plus the American Kennel Club.

The breed was definitively accepted by the Fédération Cynologique Internationale in 1972, and was recognised by the American Kennel Club in 2010.

In 2015, registrations in the Nordic countries were: 137 in Iceland; 100 in Denmark; 44 in Finland; 35 in Norway; and 76 in Sweden.

Characteristics 

It is a muscular and hardy dog, and moves with ease over the rough terrain of rural Iceland. The coat is thick and provides good protection from the weather; there are two distinct types: short-haired and long-haired. It may be tan or fawn, ranging from cream-colour to a reddish brown; or black, chocolate-brown or grey. White markings, often extensive, occur with all colours; tan and grey animals may have a black mask. Dogs may be expected to live for some twelve to fifteen years.

Notes

References 

Dog breeds originating in Iceland
FCI breeds
Herding dogs
Rare dog breeds
Spitz breeds